Atle Næss (born 25 March 1949, in Mysen) is a Norwegian author. His book Galileo Galilei, when the world stood still was the winner of The Brage Prize.

Works
 Gun (1975)
 April (1977)
 830 S (1981)
 Opp fra det absolutte nullpunkt (1985)
 Sensommer (1987)
 Korsfareren (1988)(crime novel)
 Kraften som beveger (1990) The Power that Moves
 Østre linje  (1994)
 Den tvilende Thomas (1997)
 Innersvinger (2002)
 Galileo Galilei, when the world stood still (2004)
 Sensommer (2006)
 Roten av minus en (2006)
 Din nestes eiendom (2009)

References

1949 births
Living people
People from Eidsberg
20th-century Norwegian novelists
21st-century Norwegian novelists
Norwegian crime fiction writers